Təbrizli is a village and municipality in the Lerik Rayon of Azerbaijan. It has a population of 155.

References

Populated places in Lerik District